Waterboat Point is the low westernmost termination of the peninsula between Paradise Harbor and Andvord Bay on the west coast of Graham Land. This feature has "island" characteristics, but it is only separated from the mainland at high water and is more usefully described as a "point". Chile's González Videla Antarctic Base is located at Waterboat Point.

Historic site
The coast in this vicinity was first roughly surveyed by the Belgian Antarctic Expedition in 1898. The point was surveyed and given its name by Thomas W. Bagshawe and Maxime C. Lester who lived here, in a hut improvised from a water boat, from January 1921 until January 1922. Although only the base of the boat, foundations of doorposts and an outline of the hut and extension still exist, the remains and immediate environs have been designated a Historic Site or Monument (HSM 56), following a proposal by Chile and the United Kingdom to the Antarctic Treaty Consultative Meeting.

Further reading 
 Bernard Stonehouse, Historic hut site at Waterboat Point, Antarctica, Polar Record, Volume 27, Issue 163, https://doi.org/10.1017/S0032247400013152 Published online: 27 October 2009

References 

Headlands of Graham Land
Danco Coast
Historic Sites and Monuments of Antarctica